Rhagoditta is a genus of solifuges within the family Rhagodidae. Members of this genus can be found in north Africa and the Middle East.

Species 

 Rhagoditta bacillata 
 Rhagoditta blanfordi 
 Rhagoditta corallipes 
 Rhagoditta nigra 
 Rhagoditta phalangium 
 Rhagoditta susa

References 

Solifugae
Solifugae genera